The 1992 European Seniors Tour was the inaugural season of the European Seniors Tour, the professional golf tour for men aged 50 and above operated by the PGA European Tour.

Tournament results
The numbers in brackets after the winners' names show the number of career wins they had on the European Seniors Tour up to and including that event. This is only shown for players who are members of the tour.

Details of the winners are available here and here.

Leading money winners

Source: .

At the time the Order of Merit was decided in Pounds. The numbers were subsequently converted into Euros, at a rate of 1.4 Euros to the Pound, to enable career money totals to be calculated.

External links

European Senior Tour
European Senior Tour